The Umpqua River Light is a lighthouse on the Oregon Coast of the United States, located at the mouth of the Umpqua River on Winchester Bay, in Douglas County, Oregon.

History

Located at the mouth of Winchester Bay, Oregon, the first Umpqua River Light was built in 1855 and lit in 1857. Built along the river channel, the original light was vulnerable to seasonal flooding. This led to yearly erosion of the sand embankment of the light. In October 1863, the building's foundations had become too unstable and the structure soon collapsed. Before its collapse, the Light House Board had foreseen the need to build a new light at the location. However, it was 1888 before Congress approved of a construction of a new light.

Construction started on the new light in 1892, and it was first lit in 1894. Built at the same time as Heceta Head Light, it was built from the same plans and is virtually identical to its more northern sister. Unlike its predecessor, the new light had several advantages over the original light. This was partly due to the Light House Board's insistence that ships be able to plot a course based on visible lighthouses. The original light was not visible at sea and was only usable as an aid to ships approaching the river. The new light used a clockwork mechanism to rotate the Fresnel lens, and was eventually automated in 1966. The rotation mechanism served in the light for 89 years before it finally broke down and was removed. The Coast Guard, in charge of the light at this point, wanted to replace the mechanism with a new one. However, strong public outcry forced those plans to be aborted, and in 1985, the old mechanism was returned to its position after being fully restored.

The structure was listed on the National Register of Historic Places in 1977.

Visitors can tour the lighthouse and adjacent Coastal History Museum from May through September.  The museum is located in a historic U.S. Coast Guard station and features exhibits on the lighthouse, local history and the U.S. Coast Guard history on the Umpqua River.

See also
 List of lighthouses on the Oregon Coast

References

External links

 Umpqua Lighthouse State Park - official site
 Discover Oregon Lighthouses: Umpqua
 Umpqua River Lighthouse - photos and touring information
 June 9, 2005, Statesman Journal article on Umpqua River Lighthouse
 Umpqua River Lighthouse entry at Lighthouse Friends.com
 Umpqua River Light entry in National Park Service inventory of historic lighthouses 
 Close-up photos of the Umpqua River Lighthouse Fresnel lens

Lighthouses completed in 1855
Lighthouses completed in 1894
Lighthouses on the National Register of Historic Places in Oregon
Oregon Coast
IUCN Category V
Lighthouse museums in Oregon
Museums in Douglas County, Oregon
Transportation buildings and structures in Douglas County, Oregon
Parks in Douglas County, Oregon
State parks of Oregon
National Register of Historic Places in Douglas County, Oregon